Bukasa Inland Port is a planned inland port in Uganda.

Location
When fully functional, the port is expected to occupy a bigger land area. Efforts to secure more land are underway.

Overview
When completed the inland port is designed to handle up to 5.2 million tonnes of freight annually. The port will facilitate movement of goods from the Tanzanian ports of Dar es Salaam and Tanga, via rail to the port of Mwanza on Lake Victoria. Barges would then bring the cargo over the lake to Bukasa. This would reduce Uganda's near-total dependence on the port of Mombasa, Kenya.

Funding
Two German financial institutions agreed to lend US$48 million towards the construction of this port. The Uganda government will contribute US$8.5 million to this project. The funding for the construction of the port is as depicted in the table below:

 Totals may be off slightly, due to rounding.

Construction
, GAUFF Gmbh & Co. Engineering KG, a German firm that is performing the consultancy work for the construction of the port, is finalizing the master design of the development. In July 2018, dredging of the swamps is expected to commence. Physical construction of the administration unit and the shipping facilities called Roll-on/Roll-off (RoRo) is expected to commence in June 2019, and last until April 2022.  More development and expansion will continue until 2030. Construction of the initial phase is expected to last three years.

In February 2019, the National Environment Management Authority of Uganda (NEMA), approved the construction of this inland port. Construction will be phased.

 Phase I
The first phase will involve construction of the port, administration jetty, free trade zone, shunting yard, a two-berth multipurpose terminal and a two berth Roro terminal.

 Phase II

 Phase III
All three phases will require the dredging Lake Victoria.

See also
 Ministry of Works and Transport (Uganda)

References

External links
Tanzania: Bukasa - Is the Inland Port in Doubt?

Wakiso District
Ports and harbours of Uganda
Lake Victoria